Veleropilina oligotropha is a species of monoplacophoran, a superficially limpet-like marine mollusc. It is found in the Pacific Ocean to the north of Hawaii.

References

Monoplacophora
Molluscs described in 1972